Maja Poljak (born May 2, 1983, in Split) is a Croatian volleyball player. She plays as middle blocker for Dinamo Moscow. She was a member of the Women's National Team that won the silver medal at the 1999 European Championship in Italy.

Career
Maja won the 2010–11 CEV Champions League with her team Vakifbank Istanbul, and won the "Best Blocker" award.

Clubs
  Mladost Zagreb (1995-2000)
  Minetti Vicenza (2000-2003)
  Volley Bergamo (2003-2008)
  Türk Telekom Ankara (2008-2009)
  Vakifbank Istanbul (2009-2011)
  Eczacıbaşı VitrA (2011-2016)
  Dinamo Moscow (2016-2017)

Awards

Individuals
 2004-05 Women's CEV Champions League "Best Blocker"
 2005 CEV Champions League "Best Blocker"
 2011 Turkish Championships "Best Blocker"
 2010-11 CEV Champions League "Best Blocker"
 2010–11 CEV Champions League Final Four "Best Blocker"
 2014-15 CEV Champions League "Best Blocker"
 2015 FIVB Women's Club World Championship "Best Middle Blocker"
 2017 FIVB Women's Club World Championship "Best Middle Blocker"

Clubs
 2004/05 CEV Champions League -  Champion, with bergamo
 2006/07 CEV Champions League -  Champion, with bergamo
 2010/11 CEV Champions League -  Champion, with VakıfBank Güneş Sigorta Türk Telekom
 2011 Turkish Volleyball Super Cup -  Champion, with Eczacıbaşı VitrA
 2011-12 Turkish Cup -  Champion, with Eczacıbaşı VitrA
 2011-12 Aroma Women's Volleyball League -  Champion, with Eczacıbaşı VitrA
 2012 Turkish Volleyball Super Cup -  Champion, with Eczacıbaşı VitrA
 2012-2013 Turkish Women's Volleyball Cup -  Runner-Up, with Eczacıbaşı VitrA
 2012-2013 Turkish Women's Volleyball League -  Runner-Up, with Eczacıbaşı VitrA
 2014–15 CEV Champions League -  Champion, with Eczacıbaşı VitrA 
 2015 FIVB Club World Championship -  Champion, with Eczacıbaşı VitrA
 2016–17 Russian Championship -  Champion, with Dinamo Moscow

References

External links
 Official website of Italian Woman Volleyball League
 Türk Telekom Ankara Official Website Profile
 

1983 births
Living people
Croatian women's volleyball players
Middle blockers
Sportspeople from Split, Croatia
Türk Telekom volleyballers
VakıfBank S.K. volleyballers
Eczacıbaşı volleyball players
Croatian expatriate sportspeople in Italy
Croatian expatriate sportspeople in Turkey
Croatian expatriate sportspeople in Russia
Croatian expatriate volleyball players
Expatriate volleyball players in Italy
Expatriate volleyball players in Turkey
Expatriate volleyball players in Russia
Mediterranean Games medalists in volleyball
Mediterranean Games bronze medalists for Croatia
Competitors at the 2009 Mediterranean Games